Daniel Cawdery is a South African chess player who was awarded the International Master title by FIDE in 2014 (Candidate Master title in 2008 and FIDE Master title in 2013).

He won the 2015 and 2022 South African Chess Championship, and has played for the South African Chess Olympiad team in 1998, 2006, 2008, 2012, 2016 and 2018.

Cawdery qualified for the 2017 Chess World Cup where he was defeated by eventual winner Levon Aronian in the first round.

See also
 Chess in South Africa

References

External links

Daniel Cawdery chess games at 365Chess.com

Living people
South African chess players
Chess International Masters
Chess Olympiad competitors
Place of birth missing (living people)
Year of birth missing (living people)